This is a list of official football games played by Iran national football team between 1960 and 1969.

1962
Friendly

Friendly

1965
1965 RCD Cup

1965 RCD Cup

1966
Friendly

1966 Asian Games – Preliminary Round

1966 Asian Games – Preliminary Round

1966 Asian Games – Preliminary Round

1966 Asian Games – Quarterfinal

1966 Asian Games – Quarterfinal

1966 Asian Games – Semifinal

1966 Asian Games – Final

1967
1967 RCD Cup

1967 RCD Cup

1968
1968 AFC Asian Cup

1968 AFC Asian Cup

1968 AFC Asian Cup

1968 AFC Asian Cup

1969
1969 Friendship Cup

1969 Friendship Cup

1969 RCD Cup

1969 RCD Cup

Statistics

Results by year

Managers

Opponents

External links
 www.teammelli.com
 www.fifa.com

1960s in Iranian sport
1960
1961–62 in Iranian football
1964–65 in Iranian football
1965–66 in Iranian football
1966–67 in Iranian football
1967–68 in Iranian football
1968–69 in Iranian football
1969–70 in Iranian football